Karjamaa may refer to several places in Estonia:

Karjamaa, Ida-Viru County, village in Alajõe Parish, Ida-Viru County
Karjamaa, Tallinn, subdistrict of Tallinn